Giovanni Targioni-Tozzetti (17 March 186330 May 1934) was an Italian librettist.

Biography
He was best known for his friendship and collaboration with the composer Pietro Mascagni. Most of his libretti were written in collaboration with Guido Menasci.

Targioni-Tozzetti was born and died in Livorno.

Operas 
Cavalleria rusticana (1890)
I Rantzau (1892)
Regina Diaz (1894)
Silvano (1895)
Zanetto (1896)
Amica (1905)
La sposa di Nino (1913)
Pinotta (1932)
Nerone (1935)

External links
 
 

1863 births
1934 deaths
People from Livorno
Italian opera librettists
Italian male dramatists and playwrights
19th-century Italian dramatists and playwrights
19th-century Italian male writers
20th-century Italian dramatists and playwrights
20th-century Italian male writers
Mayors of Livorno